The incident referred to as Trincomalee massacre in 2006 happened when five minority Sri Lankan Tamil high school students playing by the beach were briefly detained and then shot dead by Special Task Force.

Reactions

Sri Lankan government
The government claims were contradicted by the results of the local coroner, who said that they were killed by gunshot wound in execution style. Although a court case is still pending, a Human Rights agency known as UTHR accused that a local police superintendent as the mastermind of the operation to kill the students.

Investigation
The official inquiry into this incident is still undergoing and Special Task Force personnel were remanded in connection with the murder and further remanded on 18 July 2013 by the Trincomalee Magistrate court.

Witnesses
The only witness who came forward is the target of threats to his safety.  Dr. Manoharan, the father of one of the victims, has been threatened by some elements of the Sri Lankan security forces. Human Rights Watch has called on the government to provide adequate protection for the doctor.

According to RSF a minority Tamil journalist Subramaniyam Sugirdharajan who took pictures of the slain students that proved that they died of gunshot injuries not by an explosion of a grenade as claimed by local military authorities was shot dead by unknown gunmen suspected to be paramilitary men.

Court Judgement
In 3 July the accused IPs Sarath Chandra Perera and Rohitha Vijithakumara, Sgt. M.G. Jayalath, A.P. Amal Pradeep, PCs R.K. Ratnayake, M. Chaminda Lalitha, R.M. Udhaya Mahinda Bandara, M.G.H. Sanjeewa, K.A. Tharaka Ruwansiri, J.M. Nimal Bandara, J.M. Senarath Dissanyake, S.J. Indika Thushara of the STF and SI (Retired) P.G. Ananda Bulanawewa of the Police were acquitted by Chief Magistrate M.M. Mohammed Hamza after a lengthy hearing due to the non-availability of evidence against the accused.

References

2006 crimes in Sri Lanka
January 2006 crimes
January 2006 events in Asia
Attacks on civilians attributed to the Sri Lanka Police
Massacres in Sri Lanka
Massacres in 2006
Mass murder of Sri Lankan Tamils
People shot dead by law enforcement officers in Sri Lanka
Sri Lankan government forces attacks in Eelam War IV
Terrorist incidents in Sri Lanka in 2006
Student massacres